Daniel Denison Bickham  (October 31, 1864 – August 13, 1951) was a pitcher for Major League Baseball in the 19th century. He played for the 1886 Cincinnati Red Stockings. He started one game for the Red Stockings, he won the game by pitching a complete game where he allowed 13 hits and 11 runs, though only 3 were earned. He never appeared in a Major League game again. He played college baseball at Princeton University.

Sources

1864 births
1951 deaths
Baseball players from Dayton, Ohio
19th-century baseball players
Cincinnati Red Stockings (AA) players
Princeton University alumni